Jiangnanxi Station is a station on Line 2 of the Guangzhou Metro that started operations on 29December 2002. It is located under Jiangnan Middle Avenue in the Haizhu District of Guangzhou. The station is in the main shopping area for the district.

References

Railway stations in China opened in 2002
Guangzhou Metro stations in Haizhu District